The Flame is a 1947 American  film noir crime film produced and directed by John H. Auer and starring John Carroll, Vera Ralston, Robert Paige and Broderick Crawford.

Plot
A man (Carroll) induces an ambitious nurse (Ralston) to marry for money his rich brother (Paige) who has a terminal disease.

Cast
John Carroll as George MacAllister
Vera Ralston as Carlotta Duval
Robert Paige as Barry MacAllister
Broderick Crawford as Ernie Hicks
Henry Travers as Dr. Mitchell
Hattie McDaniel as Celia
Blanche Yurka as Aunt Margaret
Constance Dowling as Helen Anderson
Victor Sen Yung as Chang
Harry Cheshire as the Minister
John Miljan as Detective
Garry Owen as Detective
Eddie Dunn as Police Officer
Jeff Corey as Stranger (uncredited)

Reception

Critical response
The critic at The New York Times panned the film, "The sole distinction of The Flame, a rambling, inept bit of claptrap which sidled into the Gotham yesterday, is the bleakly amusing fact that most of the performers seem either bored or amused with the whole thing. And no wonder. There is a grim, unimaginative which-brother-do-I-love plot, centering on Vera Ralston."

Film historian and critic Hal Erickson discussed the production values in his brief review, "In terms of both budget and histrionic level, The Flame is one of the most lavish of Republic Pictures' late-1940s productions."

See also
List of American films of 1947

References

External links

1947 films
1947 crime drama films
American black-and-white films
American crime drama films
1940s English-language films
Film noir
Films directed by John H. Auer
Republic Pictures films
Films scored by Heinz Roemheld
1940s American films